William Scanlan (6 January 1925 – 10 September 2000) was an Australian rules footballer who played with Melbourne and Footscray in the Victorian Football League (VFL).

Family
The son of Francis Scanlan (1885–1961) and Minnie Scanlan, nee Coghlan (1892–1976), William Scanlan was born in Sandringham, Victoria on 6 January 1925. He was the older brother of fellow Melbourne and Footscray VFL player Frank Scanlan.

War service
Scanlan served in the Royal Australian Air Force during World War II.

External links 

Bill Scanlan's playing statistics from The VFA Project

Notes 

1925 births
2000 deaths
Australian rules footballers from Melbourne
Melbourne Football Club players
Western Bulldogs players
Moorabbin Football Club players
People from Sandringham, Victoria
Royal Australian Air Force personnel of World War II
Military personnel from Melbourne